Milton Sayler (November 4, 1831 – November 17, 1892) was an American lawyer and politician who served as a three-term U.S. Representative from Ohio from 1873 to 1879. He was a cousin of Henry B. Sayler, who served in the U.S. Congress, representing Indiana.

Early life and career 
Born in Lewisburg, Ohio, Sayler attended the public schools.
He pursued classical studies and was graduated from Miami University, Oxford, Ohio, in 1852.
He studied law at the Cincinnati Law School.
He was admitted to the bar and commenced practice in Cincinnati, Ohio.

Political career 
He served as member of the Ohio House of Representatives in 1862 and 1863.
He served as member of the Cincinnati City Council in 1864 and 1865.

Congress 
Sayler was elected as a Democrat to the Forty-third, Forty-fourth, and Forty-fifth Congresses (March 4, 1873 – March 3, 1879).
He served as chairman of the Committee on Public Lands (Forty-fourth Congress).
He was an unsuccessful candidate for reelection in 1878 to the Forty-sixth Congress.

Later career and death 
He moved to New York City and resumed the practice of his profession.
He died in that city November 17, 1892.
He was interred in Spring Grove Cemetery, Cincinnati, Ohio.

Notes

Sources

External links
 

1831 births
1892 deaths
Miami University alumni
Politicians from Cincinnati
University of Cincinnati College of Law alumni
Cincinnati City Council members
Burials at Spring Grove Cemetery
Democratic Party members of the Ohio House of Representatives
Ohio lawyers
19th-century American politicians
19th-century American lawyers
Democratic Party members of the United States House of Representatives from Ohio